Inshushinak (Linear Elamite:  Inšušnak,  Cuneiform: , dinšušinakki; possibly from Sumerian en-šušin-a[k], "lord of Susa") was one of the major gods of the Elamites and the protector deity of Susa. He was called rišar napappair, "greatest of gods" in some inscriptions.

Character and cult 

Inshushinak is attested for the first time in the treaty of Naram-sin, much like many other Elamite gods.

He played an important role as a god connected to royal power in the official ideology of many Elamite dynasties. King Atta-Hushu of the Sukkalmah dynasty called himself "the shepherd of the god Inshushinak." Multiple rulers dedicated new construction projects to Inshushinak using the formula "for his (eg. the king's) life." Shutrukids commonly used the title "(king) whose kingdom Inshushinak loves."

He was also a divine witness of contracts, similar to Mesopotamian Shamash. Sometimes he shared this role with both Shamash and the Elamite god Simut in documents from Susa.

As a god of the afterlife 
Inshushinak was closely related to the afterlife, and appears as a judge of the dead in the so-called Susa funerary texts.  One of Inshushinak's temples was called haštu, "tomb."

The scholarly consensus is that Inshushinak's judgment involved the weighing of souls, an element unknown in Mesopotamia; the idea presumably developed independently from similar Egyptian beliefs. However, archaeologist Nathan Wassermann recently challenged this view, arguing references to weighing in the Susa funerary texts were a mistranslation.

Temples 
Inshushinak's temple located near the acropole of Susa is among the best documented buildings from that city. However multiple temples dedicated to him were located in it, including Ekikuanna ("Pure place of heaven"), a siyan husame (temple in a sacred grove) shared with Lagamar, and more.

Inscriptions of the Sumerian king Shulgi state that he built an Inshushinak temple in Susa. It's possible it was the same building as the "old temple" restored by the Sukkalmah dynasty king Kuk-Kirwash.

The kukkunum ("high temple") on top of Chogha Zanbil was dedicated to Inshushinak and Napirisha. Shutruk-Nahhunte built another Inshushinak kukkunum in Karintash.

In Achaemenid period 
The fate of Inshushinak's cult in Achaemenid times is uncertain – while Heidemarie Koch proposed that he entirely lost his importance, Wouter Henkelman pointed out in a more recent publication that there is simply no known source dealing with his cult in these times, which isn't necessarily the same as evidence of loss of status, especially considering it is known that he maintained his prestige in the final decades of the Neo-Elamite period, and that other Elamite gods, especially Humban, continued to be venerated under Achamaenid rule, not necessarily only by Elamites.

In Mesopotamia 
Inshushinak enjoyed a limited recognition in Mesopotamia, generally as a god of the underworld, associated with Ereshkigal.

According to the god list An-Anum Inshushinak was the son of Tishpak (and his wife Kulla) and the brother of Ishtaran. All three of these gods, as well as Ninazu and Ningishzida, are part of Frans Wiggermann's proposed grouping of "transtigridian snake gods" existing on the boundary between Elamite and Mesopotamian culture, sharing a connection to judgment, the afterlife and snakes, as well as similar locations of their major cult centers.

Some Babylonian sources equated both Inshushinak and Ruhurater, who had a similar role as a divine witness of contracts, with Ninurta.

Connections to other deities 
In some texts Inshushinak appears to form a trinity with two other prominent Elamite deities, Napirisha and Kiririsha. Examples can be found in the inscription of kings Untash-Napirisha (from Chogha Zanbil) and Shilhak-Inshushinak.

Lagamar and Ishmekarab were two deities associated with Inshushinak in funerary context.  They escorted the dead to Inshushinak's judgment.

Lagamar 

Lagamar or Lagamal (Akkadian: "no mercy") was an underworld deity first recorded in the Ur III period, attested as far west as Mari, and presumably introduced to Elam from Mesopotamia. Some later Mesopotamian god lists equate Lagamar with Nergal.

Most sources regard Lagamar as a male deity, though Milad Jahangirfar notes there are some claims that the name belongs to a goddess. Lagamar was regarded as the son of Urash (the tutelary god of Dilbat rather than the earth goddess Urash) in Mesopotamia  which casts doubts on the possibility of this deity being female.

Ishmekarab 

Ishmekarab (Akkadian: "he heard the prayer") was a law deity with some underworld-related functions, and also a guardian of oaths. Outside of the underworld context, texts related to oaths also associate Inshushinak with Ishmekarab.

Ishmekarab's gender is uncertain. Florence Malbran-Labat refers to Ishmekarab as a goddess, but Wilfred G. Lambert wrote that while it's not impossible that Lagamar and Ishmekarab were a mixed gender pair, it's far from certain and both of them being male is a more likely possibility.

In Mesopotamia Ishmekarab was one of the "standing gods" in Ebabbar, a cult site dedicated to Shamash.

Gallery

References

Footnotes 

Elamite gods
Mesopotamian gods
Underworld gods
Justice deities
Tutelary deities
Susa